John Edward Stripp (August 10, 1938 – August 7, 2020) was an American politician and business executive. A member of the Republican Party, he served in the Connecticut House of Representatives from 1993 to 2011 for the 135th District, which encompasses Weston, Redding and Easton. He previously served on the Board of Selectman of Weston, Connecticut from 1983 to 1992.

Early life and education 
John Edward Stripp was born August 10, 1938, in Springfield Gardens in Queens, New York, to John W. (1914–1993) and Helen Stripp (née Weidick; 1916–2010).

References 

1938 births
2020 deaths
Republican Party members of the Connecticut House of Representatives
People from Weston, Connecticut